Dubočani may refer to the following places in Bosnia and Herzegovina:

Dubočani, Ključ
Dubočani, Konjic
Dubočani, Trebinje